The 1986–87 OB I bajnokság season was the 50th season of the OB I bajnokság, the top level of ice hockey in Hungary. Seven teams participated in the league, and Ujpesti Dozsa SC won the championship.

First round

Second round

Final round

5th-7th place

External links
 Season on hockeyarchives.info

1986-87
Hun
OB